Byron Keiron Buxton (born December 18, 1993) is an American professional baseball center fielder for the Minnesota Twins of Major League Baseball (MLB). He was the second highest-rated prospect in baseball according to MLB.com and Baseball Prospectus in 2015.

Buxton attended Appling County High School in Baxley, Georgia. He was considered by some baseball analysts to be the most talented player available in the 2012 Major League Baseball draft, and was selected as the second overall pick. He won Baseball Americas Minor League Player of the Year Award in 2013. Buxton made his MLB debut in 2015 and he won the Gold Glove Award in 2017.

Amateur career
Buxton started playing baseball when he was six years old. He attended Appling County High School in Baxley, Georgia, where he played for the school's baseball, basketball and football teams. In his high school days, Buxton was given the nickname "Buck". As a pitcher during his senior year, he had a 10–1 win–loss record with a 1.90 earned run average and 154 strikeouts in 81 innings pitched. His speed eventually led him to obtaining a well-above average speed rating of 70 as he left high school and readied for the draft.

Scouts noticed Buxton when he was 15 years old. He was recruited to play on a traveling summer team.  He appeared in baseball showcases, including the East Coast Pro Showcase and Under Armour All-America Baseball Game. As a senior in high school, Buxton hit for a .513 batting average with 38 stolen bases in 39 games. Buxton committed to a college baseball scholarship with the University of Georgia, intending to attempt to walk on to the football team.

Professional career

2012–2014
Considered a five-tool player, MLB.com rated Buxton the best prospect available in the 2012 Major League Baseball draft. The Minnesota Twins selected Buxton with the second overall pick in the 2012 draft. Buxton signed a contract with the Twins on June 12, 2012, that included a $6 million signing bonus. He made his professional debut in Minor League Baseball (MiLB) with the Gulf Coast Twins of the Rookie-level Gulf Coast League (GCL), where he batted .216 in 26 games. Later in the year, he was promoted to the Elizabethton Twins of the Rookie-level Appalachian League, and batted .286 in 21 games. He was named the top prospect in the GCL.

Buxton started the 2013 season with the Cedar Rapids Kernels of the Class A Midwest League. After he batted .340 with eight home runs and 32 stolen bases to start the season, the Twins promoted Buxton to the Fort Myers Miracle of the Class A-Advanced Florida State League in June. By midseason, MLB.com, Keith Law of ESPN.com, and Baseball America viewed Buxton as the best prospect in baseball. He represented the Twins at the All-Star Futures Game. With Fort Myers, Buxton compiled a .326 average with four home runs, 22 RBIs, and 23 stolen bases. After the season, Buxton was named the Midwest League Most Valuable Player. He also won both the Baseball America Minor League Player of the Year Award and the Topps Minor League Player of the Year Award.

The Twins invited Buxton to participate in spring training in 2014. He injured his left wrist, spraining his pisotriquetral joint, while diving for a ball and opened the 2014 season on the disabled list. He was activated on May 4, and assigned to Fort Myers. After playing in five games with the Miracle, Buxton reinjured his wrist. Buxton batted .240 in 30 games before receiving a promotion to the New Britain Rock Cats of the Class AA Eastern League on August 11. In his first game with New Britain, on August 13, Buxton collided with fellow outfielder Mike Kvasnicka. Buxton was taken to the hospital and diagnosed with a concussion. The Twins shut Buxton down for the remainder of the regular season, but assigned him to the Arizona Fall League after the season.

2015–2017

Despite his having missed the majority of the 2014 season, MLB.com and Baseball Prospectus rated Buxton as the best prospect in baseball at the start of the 2015 season, and Baseball America named him the # 2 prospect in 2015. Buxton opened the 2015 season with the Twins' new Class AA affiliate, the Chattanooga Lookouts of the Southern League.  The Twins promoted Buxton to make his major-league debut on June 14. He scored the game-winning run in his debut. Buxton recorded his first hit, a triple, in his second game. After playing in ten games, Buxton sprained his thumb and went on the disabled list. The Twins activated Buxton from the disabled list on August 10 and optioned him to the Rochester Red Wings of the Class AAA International League, due to the strong play of Aaron Hicks. In the major leagues, in 2015 while striking out 44 times in 129 at bats he hit .209/.250/.326 and stole two bases in four attempts.

Buxton began the 2016 season as the Twins' starting center fielder. However, he batted .156 in 17 games, while striking out in 53% of his at bats, and was optioned to Rochester on April 25. He was called up again during mid season and remained at center field. He finished batting .225/.284/.430 with 10 home runs and 10 stolen bases in 12 attempts while striking out 118 times in 298 at bats. According to Statcast, Buxton led MLB in average sprint speed at 30.8 feet per second, after tying with Jarrod Dyson for the lead in the previous season.

Buxton was once again the Twins opening day center fielder to begin the 2017 season. He was batting just .219 at the start of August. On August 18, he was safe at home on the fastest inside-the-park home run ever recorded by Statcast, circling the bases in 13.85 seconds. On August 27, Buxton hit three home runs against the Toronto Blue Jays. He hit .324 in August with eight home runs and eight stolen bases. For the season, he batted .253/.314/.413 with 29 stolen bases in 30 attempts, while striking out 150 times in 462 at bats.  He won a Wilson Defensive Player of the Year Award for all major league fielders, as well as for center field, given to the top defensive player in the major leagues at each position. He also won a Fielding Bible Award, a Rawlings Gold Glove Award, and the Platinum Glove Award for the American League. He again led MLB in sprint speed, at 30.5 feet per second.

2018–present

Buxton's 2018 season got off to a sloppy start, as he spent some stints on the disabled list due to a toe injury and migraines. On July 2, he was activated from the disabled list, but also optioned to Triple-A Rochester. In the majors, he batted .156/.183/.200 while striking out 28 times in 90 at bats, and stole five bases without being caught. The Twins opted not to promote Buxton to the major leagues during September call-ups, a decision that Buxton said, "didn’t go over well." He yet again led MLB in sprint speed, again at 30.5 feet per second.

On April 22, 2019, Buxton´s streak of 33 stolen bases was ended after he was caught stealing by Robinson Chirinos of the Houston Astros.  In 2019, Buxton batted .262 and had the fastest sprint speed of all American League players, at 30.3 feet/second.

In the abbreviated 2020 Major League Baseball season, Buxton played 39 of Minnesota's 60 games, primarily missing time due to a shoulder injury sustained in late-August. Despite the injury, Buxton had a successful season, including a career-high .577 slugging percentage.

Buxton was named the American League Player of the Month for April 2021, when he hit .426 with 8 home runs and 14 RBIs.

On December 1, 2021, Buxton signed a seven-year, $100 million contract extension with the Twins.

When Carlos Correa joined the Twins for the 2022 season, he and Buxton became the third pair of players picked first and second in the same draft to then play for one club.  On June 9, 2022, the trio of Luis Arráez, Buxton, and Correa each hit consecutive home runs off Gerrit Cole to open the bottom of the first inning versus the New York Yankees.  Buxton then hit a three-run home run in the second inning.  In June 2022, Buxton hit his 44th home run since he had last grounded into a double play, which occurred on September 7, 2020, surpassing a record of 43 held by Matt Carpenter.  On July 5, 2022, Buxton started the first 8–5 triple play in major league history when he caught an A. J. Pollock fly ball at the wall in the bottom of the seventh inning versus the Chicago White Sox .  Buxton threw to third baseman Gio Urshela, who tagged a retreating Yoán Moncada out at second base and stepped on the bag to retire Adam Engel.

Personal life
Buxton is from Baxley, Georgia, where he spent his adolescent years through high school. His father, Felton, owns a trucking company, and his mother, Carrie, works in a school cafeteria. He has a sister. Buxton's cousin, Dexter Carter, is a former professional football player.

Buxton began dating Lindsey Tillery in 2012. She also attended Appling County High School, and was three years ahead of Buxton. They were married in 2016. The couple have two sons together; their oldest was born in 2013 and their second child was born in 2020.

References

External links

1993 births
Living people
Major League Baseball center fielders
Baseball players from Georgia (U.S. state)
African-American baseball players
American League All-Stars
People from Baxley, Georgia
Minnesota Twins players
Gulf Coast Twins players
Elizabethton Twins players
Cedar Rapids Kernels players
Fort Myers Miracle players
New Britain Rock Cats players
Glendale Desert Dogs players
Salt River Rafters players
Chattanooga Lookouts players
Rochester Red Wings players
Gold Glove Award winners
21st-century African-American sportspeople